Agallissus melaniodes is a species of longhorn beetle in the Cerambycinae subfamily. It was described by Dalman in 1823. It is known from Mexico, Honduras, and Costa Rica.

References

Agallissini
Beetles described in 1823